Virginia's 75th House of Delegates district elects one of 100 seats in the Virginia House of Delegates, the lower house of the state's bicameral legislature. District 75 represents Brunswick County and Greensville County, as well as parts of the cities of Emporia and Franklin and parts of the counties of Dinwiddie, Isle of Wight, Lunenburg, Southampton, Surry, and Sussex. The seat is currently held by Republican Otto Wachsmann.

District officeholders

References

Virginia House of Delegates districts
Emporia, Virginia
Franklin, Virginia
Brunswick County, Virginia
Greensville County, Virginia
Dinwiddie County, Virginia
Isle of Wight County, Virginia
Lunenburg County, Virginia
Southampton County, Virginia
Surry County, Virginia
Sussex County, Virginia